Federico Roma (born 27 June 1985)  is the Argentine kickboxer and Muay Thai fighter, who has held World Kickboxing Network Super Bantamweight world titles in two styles, oriental rules and Thai boxing.

Career

On September 12, 2015 Roma challenged the defending champion Tomasz Makowski  for WKN World Super Bantamweight title under oriental rules in Zielona Gora, Poland. He won the fight and became a new champion by way of TKO in the fourth round.

On October 1, 2017 Roma fought Tristan Gaetano for a vacant WKN World Super Bantamweight Muay Thai title in the main event of Simply the Best 15 Moreno, in Moreno, Buenos Aires, Argentina. He won the fight by a unanimous decision.

On March 3, 2019 Roma fought Tenshin Nasukawa in the quarterfinal bout of the 58 kg tournament at RISE World Series 2019 in Tokyo, Japan. He lost the fight by knockout in the third round.

On July 6, 2019 Roma fought Darwin Saavedra at Bosch Tour 2019: Estrellas de Acero in Morón, Argentina. He won the fight by knockout in the second round.

Titles and accomplishments
World Kickboxing Network
 2017 WKN Muay Thai World Super Bantamweight Champion
 2015 WKN Oriental rules World Super Bantamweight Champion

Fight record

|-  style="background:#fbb;"
| 2019-10-26|| Loss||align=left| Wang Junguang ||  |ONE Championship: Dawn Of Valor || Jakarta, Indonesia || TKO (3 Knockdowns/Punches) || 1 || 2:57

|-  style="background:#cfc;"
| 2019-07-06|| Win ||align=left| Darwin Saavedra ||Bosch Tour 2019: Estrellas de Acero || Morón, Argentina || KO (Knee to the body) || 2 || 1:36   

|- style="text-align:center; background:#fbb;"
| 2019-03-10 || Loss|| align="left" | Tenshin Nasukawa || Rise World Series 2019 First Round, -58 kg Tournament Quarter Final || Tokyo, Japan || KO (Cartwheel kick) || 3 || 1:35

|-  style="background:#cfc;"
| 2017-10-01|| Win ||align=left| Tristan Gaetano || Simply the Best 15 Moreno || Moreno, Buenos Aires, Argentina || Decision (Unanimous) || 5 || 3:00 
|-
! style=background:white colspan=9 |

|-  style="background:#cfc;"
| 2017-07-|| Win ||align=left| Israel Rangel  || || Mexico City, Mexico || KO (Elbow)|| 2 ||  
|-
! style=background:white colspan=9 |

|-  style="background:#cfc;"
| 2016-10-30|| Win ||align=left| Nestor Machado ||  || Buenos Aires, Argentina || KO (Punches) || 2 || 

|-  style="background:#cfc;"
| 2016-03-25|| Win ||align=left| Felipe Bocaz || Bosch Tour || Moreno, Buenos Aires, Argentina || Decision (Unanimous) || 5 || 3:00 

|-  style="background:#cfc;"
| 2015-09-12|| Win ||align=left| Tomasz Makowski || Makowski Fighting Championship 8 || Zielona Góra, Poland || TKO (injury) || 4 ||   
|-
! style=background:white colspan=9 |

|-  style="background:#cfc;"
| 2015-06-05|| Win ||align=left| Tomas Tadlanek || Simply the Best "Argentina Fight Night" || Buenos Aires, Argentina || KO (Low kick) || 4 ||   
|-
! style=background:white colspan=9 |

|-  style="background:#cfc;"
| 2014-12-19|| Win ||align=left| Claudio Marcelino || "Simply the Best 2 Caseros" || Buenos Aires, Argentina || Decision (Unanimous) || 3 || 3:00   
|-
! style=background:white colspan=9 |

|-  style="background:#cfc;"
| 2014-|| Win ||align=left| Gaston Gomez ||  || Argentina ||KO (High kick) || 2 ||

|-  style="background:#fbb;"
| 2014-07-20|| Loss||align=left| Juan Allevato || 2K9 UNLIMITED || Buenos Aires, Argentina || Decision (Majority) || 5 || 3:00   
|-
! style=background:white colspan=9 |

|-  style="background:#cfc;"
| 2014-04-25|| Win ||align=left| Cesar Benitez ||  || Argentina || Decision (Unanimous) || 3 || 3:00

|-  style="background:#fbb;"
| 2014-02-22|| Loss||align=left| Jerome Ardissone ||  || Nice, France || Decision (Unanimous) || 12 || 2:00   
|-
! style=background:white colspan=9 |

|-  style="background:#cfc;"
| 2013-10-04|| Win ||align=left| Marcelo Mendieta || ||Buenos Aires, Argentina || Decision  || 3 || 3:00 

|-  style="background:#cfc;"
| 2013-09-22|| Win ||align=left| Enzo Nahuel ||  || Buenos Aires, Argentina || Decision  || 5 || 3:00 

|-  style="background:#cfc;"
| 2013-08-23|| Win ||align=left| Jonatan Servidio ||  || Buenos Aires, Argentina || Decision  || 3 || 3:00 

|-  style="background:#cfc;"
| 2013-|| Win ||align=left|  || Bangla Stadium || Phuket, Thailand || TKO (Dcotor stoppage)|| 2 ||  

|-  style="background:#cfc;"
| 2013-|| Win ||align=left|  || Bangla Stadium || Phuket, Thailand || KO (Elbow)|| 1 ||  

|-  style="background:#cfc;"
| 2013-05-12|| Win ||align=left| Anibal Cianciaruso ||2K9 UNLIMITED ||Buenos Aires, Argentina || Decision  || 5 || 3:00

|-  style="background:#cfc;"
| 2013-04-05|| Win ||align=left|  ||  ||Buenos Aires, Argentina || KO (Low kick) || 2 || 

|-  style="background:#cfc;"
| 2013-|| Win ||align=left| Monroe ||  ||Buenos Aires, Argentina || TKO || 1 || 

|-  style="background:#cfc;"
| 2012-12-|| Win||align=left| Manuel León ||  || Buenos Aires, Argentina || TKO (Referee stoppage)|| 2|| 

|-  style="background:#cfc;"
| 2012-|| Win ||align=left| Federico Gentiluomo ||  || Argentina || Decision  || 3 || 3:00 

|-  style="background:#fbb;"
| 2012-08-24|| Loss||align=left| Alejandro Berrocal || Pepe Gordillo Producciones & CMK || Peru || Decision || 3 || 3:00   

|-  style="background:#cfc;"
| 2012-08-18|| Win ||align=left| Cristian Nieto ||  || Buenos Aires, Argentina  || TKO (Corner stoppage)|| 2 ||    

|-  style="background:#cfc;"
| 2012-06-|| Win ||align=left|  || Bangla Stadium || Phuket, Thailand || KO (Punch)|| 2 ||  

|-  style="background:#cfc;"
| 2012-04-01|| Win||align=left| Jorge Clavijo ||  || Buenos Aires, Argentina || TKO (Referee stoppage)|| 2||    

|-  style="background:#cfc;"
| 2012-|| Win||align=left| Javier Verchelli ||  || Argentina || Decision || 3|| 3:00   

|-  style="background:#cfc;"
| 2011-11-27|| Win ||align=left| Damian Medina ||  || Buenos Aires, Argentina || TKO (Doctor stoppage) || 2 || 

|-  style="background:#cfc;"
| 2011-11-05|| Win ||align=left| Dario Coria ||  || Buenos Aires, Argentina || Decision  || 5 || 2:00 

|-  style="background:#cfc;"
| 2011-10-02|| Win ||align=left| Jose Chauque || Club de la Pelea || Buenos Aires, Argentina || Decision (Unanimous) || 3 || 3:00

|-  style="background:#cfc;"
| 2011-|| Win ||align=left| Leonardo Carrera||  || Buenos Aires, Argentina || KO (Low kick) || 1 || 2:27

|-  style="background:#cfc;"
| 2010-02-14|| Win ||align=left| Leonardo Lescano ||  || Buenos Aires, Argentina || Decision  || 5 || 2:00 

|-  style="background:#fbb;"
| 2009-02-28|| Loss||align=left| Leo Carrera ||  ||  Quilmes, Argentina || KO (Punch) ||  ||  

|-  style="background:#cfc;"
| 2008-|| Win||align=left| Maxi Rodriguez ||  ||  Uruguay || KO (Spinning wheel kick) || 3 || 

|-  style="background:#cfc;"
| 2008-10-05|| Win ||align=left| Maquina Gomez || Club de la Pelea || Buenos Aires, Argentina || Decision  || 3 || 3:00

|-  style="background:#cfc;"
| 2008-08-31|| Win||align=left| Tano Sopranzi ||  ||  Buenos Aires, Argentina || TKO || 2|| 

|-  style="background:#cfc;"
| 2008-|| Win||align=left| Lucas Dadamo ||  ||  Uruguay || Decision || 3 || 3:00    

|-  style="background:#cfc;"
| 2008-|| Win||align=left| Herwin Gomes || International Kick Boxing III  ||  Uruguay || KO (Punch)|| 2 ||     

|-
| colspan=9 | Legend:

Professional Boxing record

References

1985 births
Living people
Argentine male kickboxers
Argentine Muay Thai practitioners
Sportspeople from Buenos Aires